Christopher John Mahoney (born 2 January 1959) is a British rower who competed in the 1976 and 1977 World Junior Championships, the 1980 Summer Olympics, the 1981 World Championships and the 1984 Summer Olympics.

He won a bronze medal at the 1977 World Junior Championships, silver in the 1980 Olympics and silver in the 1981 World Championships. 

He was born in London. Mahoney studied at Oriel College, Oxford.  He rowed in the 1979, 1980 and 1981 University Boat Races, winning all three. He was President of the OUBC in 1981.

He was a four time winner at Henley Royal Regatta including in the Grand Challenge Cup in 1981 and 1984.

Mahoney was the head of the agricultural division of Glencore PLC and subsequently CEO of Glencore Agriculture from 2002 until 2019.

References

External links
 Sports Reference profile
 

1959 births
English male rowers
British male rowers
Olympic rowers of Great Britain
Rowers at the 1980 Summer Olympics
Rowers at the 1984 Summer Olympics
Olympic silver medallists for Great Britain
Olympic medalists in rowing
Alumni of Oriel College, Oxford
Living people
Medalists at the 1980 Summer Olympics
World Rowing Championships medalists for Great Britain